State Route 10 Loop (SR 10 Loop, also known as Loop 10, Paul Broun, Sr. Parkway, or the Athens Perimeter) is a  state highway in the form of a beltway around downtown Athens in the U.S. state of Georgia built to freeway standards. Much of SR 10 Loop is concurrent with other highways (including U.S. Route 29 (US 29), US 78, US 129, US 441, SR 8, and SR 15). It also carries the unsigned SR 422. The only numbered routes to travel through downtown Athens are US 78 Bus., SR 10, and SR 15 Alt. Inner/outer directions are used to sign the loop.

Between exits 4 and 8, there is an eight-route concurrency, consisting of US 29, US 78, US 129, US 441, SR 8, SR 10 Loop, SR 15, and the unsigned SR 422. This concurrency contains the most highways in a single United States concurrency, tied with a section of the I-465 beltway circling Indianapolis, Indiana.

Route description

SR 10 Loop begins at an interchange with US 29, US 78, SR 8 and SR 316 to the south, and Epps Bridge Parkway to the north in Oconee County south of Athens. It heads east as a four-lane freeway, concurrent with US 29, US 78, and SR 8, and crosses McNutt Creek to enter Clarke County and Athens as it meets a partial cloverleaf interchange with US 129, US 441 and SR 15, which includes a connection to Timothy Road to the north. Those three routes join SR 10 Loop as it continues east and crosses the Middle Oconee River. The freeway then curves to the northeast and intersects Milledge Avenue, where SR 15 Alternate begins, heading north from the interchange.

After this intersection, SR 10 Loop crosses a Georgia shortline railroad and turns to the northeast, where it meets College Station Road at a diamond interchange. At this point the highway right-of-way abuts the University of Georgia campus; immediately north of the College Station Road interchange is an on-ramp to a campus parking lot that is normally closed, but is used on home football game days to allow departing spectators access onto inner 10 Loop directly from campus. Northeast of here, the highway crosses the North Oconee River and meets a folded diamond interchange with SR 10, which is Oconee Street west of the interchange and Lexington Road east of it. At this interchange, US 78 splits from the highway and turns east, and its business route (US 78 Bus.) begins and heads west toward the center of the city.

North of this interchange, SR 10 Loop curves to the northwest and intersects with Peter Street and Olympic Drive at a partial cloverleaf interchange, then crosses Trail Creek and a CSX railroad, then meets an interchange with Old Hull Road. This interchange does not provide complete access between the two roads; there is only an exit going northbound and only an entrance from Old Hull Road going southbound. Just north of here, the highway meets an interchange at which US 29 and SR 8 continue north towards Hartwell and Greenville, South Carolina while SR 10 Loop, US 129, US 441, and SR 15 exit and turn due west. This interchange also completes access to Old Hull Road by providing the movements missing from the aforementioned interchange: an exit from the inner loop and an entrance to the outer loop.

West of this interchange, the freeway passes over the western fork of Trail Creek, then meets a partial cloverleaf interchange with North Avenue and Danielsville Road. Farther west, it intersects Dr Martin Luther King Jr Parkway and Commerce Road at a diamond interchange. Here, US 441 and SR 15 leave the freeway and turn north along Commerce Road. SR 10 Loop then curves in a southwesterly direction and crosses the North Oconee River again before coming to another diamond interchange, this one with Chase Street.

SR 10 Loop continues southwest and crosses the CSX railroad again, then dips to the north and intersects SR 15 Alternate, which is Prince Avenue south of the interchange and Jefferson Road north of it. At this interchange, US 129 leaves SR 10 Loop and joins SR 15 Alternate heading north towards Jefferson. The freeway's next exit to the southwest is a diamond interchange with Tallassee Road and Oglethorpe Avenue. Farther southwest, SR 10 Loop crosses the Middle Oconee River again, then intersects SR 10 and US 78 Bus at a partial cloverleaf interchange with Atlanta Highway.

Then, SR 10 Loop curves back to the southeast, crosses McNutt's Creek, leaving Athens and crossing back into Oconee County. The freeway has one final exit with the Oconee Connector, access to which is incomplete; the outer loop has only an exit, and the inner loop has only an entrance. Finally, the highway curves back to the east and meets the interchange with US 29, US 78, SR 8, and SR 316, where the exit numbers reset and the loop begins again.

The entire length of SR 10 Loop is part of the National Highway System, a system of routes determined to be the most important for the nation's economy, mobility, and defense.

History

1960s
The highway that would eventually become SR 10 Loop was established as SR 350 between June 1960 and June 1963. It extended from US 129/SR 15 in the northwestern part of the city to US 29/SR 8 in the northeastern part. The entire divided highway was paved. By the end of 1965, US 29 was designated on SR 350 from the US 129/SR 15 interchange, which also had US 29 Temp. and US 441 Temp., to the US 29/SR 8 interchange. US 441 Temp. was designated on it from the US 129/SR 15 interchange to the US 441/SR 15 Alt. interchange. A western extension of SR 350, ending at US 29/US 78/SR 8/SR 10, was under construction. Also, SR 350 was under construction east-southeast just slightly from the US 29/SR 8 interchange. In 1966, SR 350 was decommissioned. US 29 was designated on the freeway from the western terminus to where it, as well as SR 8, depart the freeway. This interchange also had SR 8 Bus. and SR 106. SR 8 was designated on the entire length of the freeway. Its former path through the city was redesignated as SR 8 Bus., still concurrent with US 78/SR 10. In 1967, US 29 was extended on the freeway one interchange to the east. At this interchange, SR 72 was extended southeast to end here, concurrent with US 29/SR 8.

1970s and 1980s
In 1976, SR 72 was indicated to be "projected mileage" from this point south to US 78/SR 10, then southwest and west to end at US 441/SR 15. In 1980, the freeway was completed along this path, with US 129/US 441/SR 15 designated on it. The next year, the portion of the freeway between US 29/SR 8/SR 72 and US 78/SR 10 on the northeastern part was downgraded to a divided highway. In 1983, the final piece of the freeway on the southwestern part was indicated to be designated as SR 732 as projected mileage. US 129/US 441/SR 15 Alt. was designated on the freeway from the southern end to their current respective interchanges. In 1985, US 441 Temp. was no longer shown on maps. SR 72's western terminus was truncated to the far northeastern part of the city, at its current location. In 1987, the freeway was completed in the southwestern part of the city. SR 10 was designated on it from the original western terminus to the eastern US 78/SR 10 Bus. interchange. Its old path through downtown, still concurrent with US 78, was redesignated as SR 10 Bus. At this time, SR 72 was re-extended to the northeastern interchange. The next year, SR 10 was shifted back to downtown, with SR 10 Loop designated on the freeway. US 78 was shifted to the southern side of the freeway, with its former path redesignated as US 78 Bus.

1990s and 2000s
In 1991, SR 15 and SR 15 Alt. in the area were swapped to their current paths. In 1995, US 29/SR 8 was also shifted to the southern side of the freeway, concurrent with US 78/SR 316. SR 72's western terminus was once again truncated to its current location. This brief concurrency ended at Macon Highway. The next year, US 129/US 441/SR 15 was shifted off of Macon Highway and onto the freeway. In 2004, the unsigned SR 422 designation was applied to the freeway.

New exit numbers were assigned on August 2, 2004.

2010s
In 2011, the half-diamond interchange at Oconee Parkway was added, with access limited from the parkway to the inner loop, and from the outer loop to the parkway. In 2015, the entirety of Loop 10 was made a freeway with the upgrade of the at-grade junction at Peter Street and Olympic Drive to a partial cloverleaf interchange.

Future
The folded diamond interchange at SR 10 (Lexington Road/Oconee Street; Exit 8) is planned to be upgraded in 2025. A new ramp will be built from SR 10 and Barnett Shoals Road to access the outer loop alongside a project that will widen SR 10. It is undecided whether the existing loop ramp from SR 10 to the outer loop should be removed or not.

The interchange with SR 8/US 29 at the northeastern most point on the loop is planned to upgrade the two bridges over SR 10 Loop heading east and west-bound, with two lanes over each bridge. Construction is planned to start in 2021.

Exit list

See also

Notes

References

External links

 Georgia State Route 10 Loop on OpenStreetMap.org
 Georgia State Route 422 on OpenStreetMap.org
 GDOT map of Athens (note that exit 4 has been moved west)

010 Loop
Transportation in Clarke County, Georgia
Transportation in Oconee County, Georgia
Transportation in Athens, Georgia
Beltways in the United States